State Route 341 (SR 341) is a  north–south state highway located entirely within Walker County in the northwestern part of the U.S. state of Georgia. It connects the unincorporated community of Davis Crossroads with Chattanooga Valley, via Chickamauga.

Route description
SR 341 begins at an intersection with SR 193 in Davis Crossroads, northwest of LaFayette. It travels to the northeast and curves to the north-northeast, along the West Chickamauga Creek valley, to the town of Chickamauga. The route then turns to the northwest. Just before entering Chattanooga Valley, it curves to a northerly routing. In Chattanooga Valley, SR 341 meets its northern terminus, another intersection with SR 193.

SR 341 is not part of the National Highway System, a system of roadways important to the nation's economy, defense, and mobility.

History

Between 1960 and 1963, SR 341 was established along its current routing.

Major intersections

See also

References

External links

341
Transportation in Walker County, Georgia